José López Martínez (born 9 June 1914 – 3 December 1989) was a Spanish footballer who played as a forward. He was best known for his stint with Sevilla in the 1940s.

Playing career
López was part of a renowned offensive line at Sevilla called the "Stuka", alongside Pepillo, Raimundo Blanco, Campanal I, and Rafael Berrocal.

References

External links

1914 births
1989 deaths
Footballers from Seville
Spanish footballers
Association football forwards
Sevilla FC players
La Liga players
Segunda División players